The following are fictional characters from Disney's 1997 film Hercules and from the derived TV series. These productions are adaptations of Greek mythology, and as such, are very different from the classical versions.

Hercules

Hercules is the titular character of the franchise. He is based on the mythological Heracles, commonly referred to by the Roman spelling, Hercules. In the original movie, Josh Keaton voiced Hercules as a teenager, while Tate Donovan was the hero as an adult, and Roger Bart was Hercules' singing voice in the song "Go the Distance". His appearance is a handsome young man, with orange hair and eyebrows and wide blue eyes. All elbows and knees, Hercules is represented as an overgrown gangly youth who doesn't know his own strength. He often inadvertently destroys things or humiliates himself. As a gawky and awkward teenager, Hercules is depicted as tall and thin, with broad, but stooped shoulders, extraordinarily long arms and legs, huge hands and pigeon-toed feet, a long skinny neck, and oversized ears. He wears a one-sleeved Greek tunic. After completing his hero training, Hercules physically changes to being top-heavy and muscular, having larger biceps and pectorals and a thicker neck, as well as a stance that changes from stooped and pigeon-toed to upright, with the chest puffed out and his feet turned out. However, despite his bravado and becoming the model of physical perfection as an adult, Hercules still retains some of his teenage flaws, such as being shy and awkward. As a hero, Hercules wears a brown-orange brass Cuirass-like tank armor tunic with a blue cape.

In the original movie, instead of the being the demigod hero son of Zeus and the mortal Alcmene, Hercules was actually born on Mount Olympus as a god, and his parents were Zeus and Hera, the latter of whom is re-imagined as a loving mother instead of a spiteful stepmother. However, one god is upset about the new arrival: Hercules' evil uncle Hades, who wants to take control of Olympus and the world, along with all of creation. Knowing that, as a god, Hercules is immortal and invulnerable to harm, Hades sends his two lackeys, Pain and Panic, to kidnap Hercules and turn him mortal by means of a magic potion. However, the arrival of two mortals, Amphitryon and Alcmene, causes Hercules to miss the final drop of the potion, causing him to retain his superhuman strength despite becoming mortal. The couple then adopts the child, considering his arrival a gift from the gods since they are themselves childless. Zeus and the other gods discover the kidnapping too late, and because Hercules is now mortal, he cannot return to Mount Olympus.

Growing up into a clumsy teenager, Hercules is all elbows and knees, not being able to control his godlike strength. He has difficulty being accepted by others due to being a geek. His clumsiness and uncoordinated strength leads to him accidentally destroying a marketplace. Shortly afterward, Hercules is told about his adoption by Amphitryon and Alcmene. This inspires Hercules to visit the temple of Zeus, where he learns of his godhood. Zeus tells Hercules that he must prove himself a true hero, instructing him to find the trainer of heroes Philoctetes (or "Phil"), while giving him the winged horse Pegasus to assist. Phil at first declines returning to the hero training business, unconvinced that Hercules was the son of Zeus, but is convinced after Zeus strikes him with lightning. Having reached adulthood and passed his training, full of confidence and bravado, an eager Hercules sets off with Phil to become a hero in Thebes. On his way, after a few sloppy mistakes, Hercules saves Megara from Nessus, a centaur acting as the river guardian, and is immediately smitten with the young woman. Unbeknownst to Hercules, Meg is working for Hades (albeit unwillingly) and relates the events to the Lord of the Underworld, from which he learns that Hercules is still alive and plots to kill the would-be hero at the start of his career. Meanwhile, Hercules arrived in Thebes and announces himself as a hero, only for the Thebans to dismiss him as an amateur and refusing to give Hercules a chance to prove himself. Right on cue, Meg appears and lures Hercules into saving two boys (Pain and Panic in disguise) trapped in a cave in a rocky canyon. After freeing the "boys" from under a rock, Hercules in reality releases a giant serpent-like creature, the Hydra, an unintended consequence of a seemingly virtuous act which has been set up as a fixed contest by Hades to humiliate and kill the young hero. A crowd of Thebans watch as Hercules bravely faces the Hydra with just his sword and his wits, albeit with clumsy fighting techniques, during which he struggles to defeat the frightening foe. Although the beast initially swallows him whole, Hercules cuts his way out by decapitation and re-emerges intact. Standing next to the Hydra's headless carcass, Hercules is quick to congratulate himself, only for three more heads to grow from the body. Flying around on Pegasus, Hercules is forced on the defensive; he keeps slicing off heads, evventually ends up surrounded by a swarm of Hydra heads, as they gang up to attack him. Finally, Hercules smashed his fists into the mountainside, causing an avalanche that buriesthe multi-headed monster under a mountain of rocks. Having accomplished the heroic task, Hercules emerges victorious, earning newfound fame and adoration from the citizens of Thebes as well as the anger of Hades. After defeating the Hydra, Hercules continued his heroics: subduing monsters and overcoming disasters. By this time, Hercules has disposed a variety of other monsters sent by Hades and the hero becomes the toast of Greece. Meeting with Zeus, Hercules believes himself ready to rejoin the gods but is greatly upset when his father tells him that his celebrity status is not enough to regain his immortality, as being famous isn't the same as being a "true hero", and to "look inside his heart". After escaping a gaggle of fangirls, Meg convinces Hercules to play hookie, going on a date. At first, she was trying to learn any weakness he might have, but she eventually fell as hard for him as he had for her. The date is ended by Phil, irate at Hercules for skipping training. Phil is knocked off Pegasus, and wakes up in time to learn of Meg's involvement with Hades. He leaves to tell Hercules, not hearing Meg's refusal to help destroy Hercules. Hercules, ecstatic from the date, refuses to believe Phil's warning about Megara, even hitting him in a flash of blind anger, prompting Phil to quit.

Hades, realizing that Meg herself is Hercules' weakness, confronts Hercules, offering Megara's safety if the hero will give up his strength for 24 hours. Hercules is reluctant to see anyone hurt, but Hades vows that no harm will come to Meg. Hercules agrees, and Hades takes the opportunity to humiliate him before revealing Megara's role in his scheme. Enacting his plan, Hades sends a Cyclops to destroy Hercules. Without his superhuman strength and crushed by Meg's betrayal, Hercules is brutally beaten about by the monster but, after Meg convinces Phil to return and help Hercules, is able to defeat the Cyclops and send him hurtling off a cliff. The monster's fall causes a pillar to topple towards Hercules and Meg pushes him out of the way, taking the impact of the pillar. This in turn causes Hercules to regain his strength because Hades' end of the bargain is now broken as he promised that Meg wouldn't get hurt. Hercules leaves Megara in the care of his friends while he rushes off to thwart Hades' invasion of Olympus. Freeing the captured gods, he captures three of the Titans in the tornado body of the fourth and throws them into space, where they explode. He returns to Meg's side only to learn that her injuries were fatal. However, he then travels to the Underworld to rescue Meg's spirit from the River Styx, which ages mortals upon ontact. Hercules nevertheless enters the pool to rescue Megara's soul. He is able to reach Meg before he dies and his selfless act fulfills the requirement for being a true hero, thus regaining his godhood. He then punches Hades into the River Styx, and returns Meg's soul to her body. He is invited by Zeus to live on Olympus, but he decides to live his life on Earth with Megara.

In creating the design for the infant version of Hercules used in the film, animator Randy Haycock drew inspiration by videotaping a friend's six-month-old and by renting movies with babies in them, while the curly hairstyle for baby Hercules was derived from the appearance of Haycock's infant daughter. He adds, "Hercules' mannerisms come right off things I've picked up from her", even though Hercules is more caricatured than a real baby. The inspiration for teenage Hercules came from Haycock's experiences as an adolescent. "I was too tall and skinny for my age, and I was a lousy athlete. At home I broke just about everything..." Teenage Hercules has big hands and feet that the animator remembers having himself, as well as the lack of coordination. Andreas Deja was supervising animator for the adult version of Hercules. He studied photographs of Olympic athletes, not the weightlifters with short necks and bulging muscles, but the swimmers, with long necks and natural musculature. Essentially, he wanted to return to the Greek tradition of character drawing. As Deja explains, this means "straight nose, pursed lips – almost cherubic, large eyes, a lidded look...The classic style you find on Greek vases or drawings."

The 1998 TV series Hercules: The Animated Series follows the character's teenage adventures before the main events of the film, with Tate Donovan reprising his role. Taking place during the years he spent training on how to be a hero under the tutelage of satyr Phil, the Greek god Hercules is still in "geek god" mode, before his "Zero to Hero" transformation, and is also referred to as a "demigod" throughout the series. Young Hercules is a hero-in-training enrolled at Prometheus Academy, a high school for both gods and mortals. Since events occur before young Hercules meets and falls for 
Megara, he is joined by two new friends, Icarus and Cassandra. Many of the Olympian Gods and Goddesses pay visits to the young hero-to-be, and either help or hinder him in his new adventures.

Hercules has also appeared in the Kingdom Hearts series. In the series, Sora must help Hercules defeat Hades, who, having joined Maleficent's group of Disney Villains, is still trying to take over Olympus. In the first game, he is voiced by Sean Astin, but Tate Donovan reprises his role in the later games, as does Josh Keaton as the younger Hercules in the prequel Kingdom Hearts: Birth by Sleep. His Japanese voice is done by Yasunori Matsumoto, with Masakazu Suzuki voicing the younger Hercules in Birth by Sleep.

Hercules also appeared in the television series Disney's House of Mouse, in the Walt Disney World version of Fantasmic!, occasionally at the Walt Disney Parks and Resorts for greetings in the Long Lost Friends area, and in Fantasyland. Hercules also had his own stage show on the Disney Cruise Line. Hercules is a playable character available to unlock for a limited time in Disney Magic Kingdoms.

Hercules appears on the 13th episode of the fifth season of Once Upon a Time portrayed by Jonathan Whitesell.

Megara
Megara (commonly shortened to Meg) is a young woman who used to work for Hades, the Lord of the Underworld. Megara has fair skin and waist-length dark auburn hair which is pulled into a ponytail. She appears to wear purple makeup to match the color of her eyes and a Grecian-style dress. She also wears a dark purple loose-sash around her waist. Sometime during the events of Hercules, Meg went to Hades and sold her soul to revive a lover of hers who had died. Hades agreed on the condition that she serve him forever, which she accepted. However, shortly after her lover was revived, he fell in love with someone else and left Meg locked in servitude to Hades. While Meg follows Hades' orders, she shows open defiance at times and a cheeky attitude.

Meg first appears on screen while trying to convince the centaur Nessus to join Hades' forces, only to have him attempt to seduce her. Hercules intervenes, defeating Nessus in a fight and becoming enamoured of Meg, which Hades plans to use to his advantage. Later in Thebes, Meg lures Hercules to the Hydra, whom he defeats. After Hercules achieves several more victories, Meg is openly smug and confident that he cannot be defeated. Hades offers Meg her freedom in exchange for discovering Hercules' weakness. Meg, however, develops feelings for Hercules instead. Eventually Hades realizes that Meg's affection is perhaps his only undoing and uses her as leverage to convince Hercules to give up his enhanced strength for one day in return for her safety; if the deal is broken, his superhuman strength returns. To prevent Meg from persuading Hercules to deny this, Hades has her bound and gagged with smoke. Hades then reveals Meg worked for him all along, causing him to leave Hercules heartbroken. Meg and Phil later find Hercules being clobbered by the Cyclops and saves him from the fall of a collapsing column and dies in process. Hercules succeeds in reclaiming her spirit and restoring her life during his foray into the Underworld. Once ascended to the Olympus, he declines immortality offered to him amongst the gods and opts to remain on Earth with Meg.

In Hercules: The Animated Series, Meg appeared twice, once as a teenager and once as an adult from the movie timeline. She meets Hercules, offering a chance to prove himself as a hero. Having him retrieve her the amphora so she can use it to forget about Adonis who she had a blind date with that went badly. They do retrieve it from Ares' sons, but Meg leaves Hercules to escape. She is immediately taken to the Underworld by Pain and Panic; Hercules, despite her betrayal, goes after her. During a fight for the amphora, Meg tells Hercules that she liked him from the start. They almost kiss, but the amphora's water is dropped on them, causing them to forget how they met, and reinforcing the fact that Hercules and Meg never established any relationship until the film. Another episode, "Hercules and the Yearbook", takes place after the events of the film and features Hercules and Meg moving his stuff from Phil's island. Hermes delivers a special package, which Hercules immediately hides from Meg. Phil reveals all of Hercules' incidents during his school time, and Hercules tells Meg he did not want to show her the yearbook because he wants her to see him as a hero. Meg tells him that she accepts that part of his life as an awkward phase, and loves him just the same. However, this does not stop Hercules from having Hermes retrieve Meg's own yearbook where it is revealed Meg was a cheerleader and in the glee club.

Meg appears in Kingdom Hearts II and meets Sora in the Underworld entrance. She assists Sora in the fight against the Hydra by providing useful items. She returns in the sequel, Kingdom Hearts III. She also appears in Disney's House of Mouse as a guest.

In all English-language media, Meg is voiced by Susan Egan.

Kacey Rohl played the live-action version of Meg in the fifth season of Once Upon a Time.

Meg is loosely based on the mythological Megara, first wife of Hercules in mythology, with undertones from another mythological figure, Deianira, who in Greek mythology was the third wife of Hercules.

Phil
Philoctetes (Phil for short), is a satyr who is a trainer of aspiring heroes who has often been disappointed by his trainees' shortcomings. He has long-since retired after failing to train a successful hero, but is convinced to train the callow young Hercules. While training Hercules or watching him fight, Phil would constantly utter at least one of his 101 rules.

After his training is complete, Phil, Hercules and Pegasus set out for the city of Thebes for Hercules to use his skills and to prove his newfound worth as a hero. Along the way, Hercules saves a woman named Megara from being pestered by the centaur Nessus, though Phil berates Hercules for the sloppy mistakes he made in the fight. While Hercules becomes attracted to Megara, Phil immediately clashes with her, considering her a distraction. After Hercules offers himself as a hero in Thebes, with Phil insists that he was the "genuine article", the Thebans dismiss Hercules as an "amateur" rather than a professional hero. Phil ran for cover while Hercules battled the Hydra, until the young hero emerges victorious by burying the multi-headed monster in a landslide. Upon the defeat of the Hydra and other various monsters, Phil becomes a personal manager to the celebrity hero Hercules has become. Later in the film, Phil discovers that Megara is working for Hades, her mission being to find Hercules' weakness. Phil tries to warn Hercules, but abandons him after an argument ensues and Hercules slaps him in his anger. When Hercules loses his powers to Hades, Megara convinces Phil to return to Hercules, motivating him into battling and defeating the Cyclops through improvisation. During the fight, Megara is mortally wounded by a falling column to save Hercules, and Phil is left taking care of Megara while Hercules fights Hades and the Titans. After Hercules defeats Hades, Phil goes with Hercules to Mount Olympus, where he is seen making out with Aphrodite. When Hercules and his friends return to Thebes, Phil is gratified when the people refer to the mighty and triumphant Hercules as "Phil's boy".

In the TV series Disney's Hercules Phil is still Hercules's coach and is now his best friend and sidekick. His training with Odysseus and Achilles remains intact.

Phil has also appeared in the Disney/Square Enix video game series Kingdom Hearts, as well as in the television animated series House of Mouse. Phil is also a playable character to unlock for a limited time in Disney Magic Kingdoms.

In the film, Philoctetes' voice is provided by Danny DeVito, while Robert Costanzo fills the role in the character's video game and television appearances. Ichirō Nagai supplies Phil's Japanese voice, while Lakis Lazopoulos was cast for Phil's voice in the Greek-language version of the film.

Pegasus
Pegasus (vocal effects by Frank Welker) is the winged horse of Hercules, created by Zeus out of clouds. Pegasus is very true and a great "friend" of Hercules and helps in everything. Described by Zeus himself as "a magnificent horse with the brain of a bird", Pegasus' behavior mixes elements of both a steed and a bird, with habits such as clicking his tongue, whistling, and at times, perching on one of Hercules' shoulders. The characterization is under the archetype of a "friendly beast". Frank Welker does Pegasus' horse sounds.

Pegasus has also appeared in the Disney/Square Enix video games Kingdom Hearts II and Kingdom Hearts III. Pegasus is also a playable character to unlock for a limited time in Disney Magic Kingdoms.

Hades
Hades (voiced by James Woods) is the brother of Zeus and Poseidon. Unlike his mythological counterpart, who is typically portrayed as a feared but relatively passive deity, he is a fast-talking, ornery, lord of the underworld: a combination of Satan and a sleazy dodgy persuasive Hollywood agent type/car dealer. He wears a dark robe with a skull-shaped perone fastening his chiton and his hair is a glowing blue flame, similar to will o'the wisp flames, which flares up whenever he becomes excited or — more famously — flares red whenever he becomes enraged, and can also be extinguished. Hades seeks to overthrow Zeus and rule the universe, in line with other pop-culture Hades's being villainous due to association with death.

In Hercules, upon visiting the Fates, Hades learns that he could succeed at universal conquest by releasing the Titans in eighteen years, but if Hercules should fight, Hades will fail. He sends his minions, Pain and Panic, to kidnap baby Hercules and give him a potion that would render him mortal, and kill him. Hercules needs to drink every last drop for it to work, but ends up losing the last drop, thus retaining his godlike strength. Pain and Panic, however, tell Hades that Hercules is dead, hoping that he will not find out.

A young woman named Megara (who also appeared in the animated series) sells her soul to Hades so that he will return her boyfriend's soul. He does, but Meg's boyfriend ungratefully dumps her for another girl afterwards. Meg remains trapped as a slave to Hades, and he uses her beauty, charm and intelligence as an advantage to persuade monsters to join his army. After discovering that Hercules is still alive, Hades sets up the Hydra as a fixed contest, with a crowd assembled to view the humiliation and destruction of Hercules, only for the multi-headed monster to be buried in a rockslide. Frustrated, Hades sends more monsters, only for Hercules to defeat them all. When he finds out that Hercules has fallen in love with Megara, he uses this to his advantage and makes a deal with Hercules: he must give up his superhuman strength for the next twenty-four hours in exchange for Meg's freedom. Hercules agrees, as long as Meg will be safe from any harm. Hades then reveals that Megara was working for him the whole time, crushing Hercules' will to fight. Hades then releases the Titans, who defeat and imprison the gods, and sends the Cyclops to kill Hercules to keep him from getting in the way, but Hercules defeats the monster using his wits. However, Megara is seriously injured saving Hercules from a falling pillar, negating Hades's deal that Meg would not be hurt. Hercules is thus given his powers back and returns to Mount Olympus where he defeats the Titans and frees the gods. Hades is upset by this, but he taunts Hercules that he at least has a parting gift; while Hercules was fighting the Titans, Megara died from her injuries.

At the film's post-climax battle, Hercules travels to the Underworld to rescue her soul and offers himself to Hades in exchange for Megara's freedom. He swims into the River Styx to retrieve her soul. It almost kills him, but his godhood is restored by his being willing to risk his own life to save the woman he loves. Hercules emerges from the pit with Megara's soul in his arms, much to Hades' shock and anger. Knowing that he can't stop Hercules in his path, Hades begs the hero to try and ease things with him and the other gods, but Hercules angrily punches Hades into the River Styx, where he is swarmed by vengeful souls and dragged to the depths. In "Hercules and the Yearbook", it is revealed that he eventually succeeded in getting out of the River Styx and gave up his quest to rule the cosmos, albeit offscreen.

Hades also appears in several episodes of the television series House of Mouse. In one episode, he tried to ask Maleficent out on a date and asked Mickey for advice. When Mickey's kind and nice ways did not sway Maleficent, Hades won her over by showing his own, fiery personality in a fit of rage towards Mickey. The two were referred to by Minnie Mouse as "a match not made in heaven". On another occasion, when Pete tries to get the House closed by turning up the thermostat- Mickey's contract stating that the House will close if it is ever empty-, Hades' ability to tolerate heat means that he remains comfortable in the House despite the rise in temperature, thus allowing Mickey to keep the House open. He also appears briefly in the series' direct-to-video film Mickey's Magical Christmas: Snowed in at the House of Mouse. He is also one of the main villains in the other direct-to-video film Mickey's House of Villains; James Woods only provides the voice for one line ("Ha – love that") in response of a Halloween joke by Mickey, being a reused scene from House of Mouse, while Rob Paulsen provides the singing voice of Hades in the song "It's Our House Now!".

Hades appears in the Kingdom Hearts series of video games. He was originally in league with Maleficent, using the Heartless to try to take over the worlds. Hades wanted to dispose of Hercules and tricked Cloud Strife into challenging Hercules in the Preliminaries at the Olympus Colliseum. In return, Hades "promised" Cloud he will lead him to Sephiroth. However, when Sora arrived, Hades changed plans and had Cloud attack Sora first. When Cloud refused to kill Sora (or was defeated by him, depending on the outcome), Hades sends out Cerberus to take care of Cloud. Hercules arrived to get Cloud to safety while Sora & company dealt with Cerberus. After Maleficent's defeat, Hades himself battles Sora and lost as all his schemes against Sora and the others end in failure. In Kingdom Hearts: Chain of Memories, a facsimile Hades appeared as token of Sora's memory and the darkness in Riku's heart. In Kingdom Hearts II, Hades's desire to kill Hercules is still undeterred. After joining forces with Pete, and probably Maleficent through him, Hades decides to use Auron, who has already died, to fight against Hercules and kill him; however, Auron rebels against Hades and fights him, only to be interrupted by Sora, Donald Duck and Goofy. They fight Hades, but, due to the Underworld curse, he is invincible to their attacks. Hades then sends Cerberus and later the Hydra against Sora and his friends. Upon discovering that Sora's Keyblade could unlock any lock, Hades initially plans to use it to unlock the Underdrome, the Underworld's own coliseum. However, when Pete informs him that the Keyblade will only work for Sora, Hades kidnaps Meg and traps her in the locked Underdrome, forcing Sora to unlock it to rescue her. After defeating Pete and the Hydra again, Sora and his friends eventually fight and defeat Hades. However, Hades survives and acts as a challenger in the last tournaments, which are unlocked near the end of the game. In the prequel, Kingdom Hearts Birth by Sleep, he attempts to use Terra to kill Hercules, but Terra resists the Darkness in his heart, so Hades places Zack under his control to eliminate both Terra and Hercules, but Terra defeats Zack and frees him from Hades' influence. Later, Hades and the Ice Colossus (a replica of the Ice Titan) both fight Aqua in the Coliseum, but Aqua defeats the both of them and Hades flees to the Underworld to further his plans. In Kingdom Hearts III, Hades puts his final plan into motion, unleashing all the Titans to assault Olympus, but Hercules, along with Sora, Donald, and Goofy, were able to thwart his plans. James Woods reprises his role for the English versions of the games, while his Japanese voice in all the games is done by Japanese stage actor Kyusaku Shimada, who does an impersonation of Woods.

Hades is also a playable character to unlock for a limited time in Disney Magic Kingdoms.

Hades stars in "Villains Tonight" on the Disney Magic and Disney Dream. "Villains Tonight" is a musical stage show featuring many different villains from various Disney films, including Doctor Facilier, Ursula, Scar, Yzma, Maleficent, Evil Queen, Captain Hook, Cruella de Vil, Jafar, and his two sidekicks Pain and Panic. The story here is Hades has "softened a bit" and made the Underworld a fun place. Unfortunately, the Fates tell him he has until midnight to get more evil or he will no longer rule the Underworld. So he summons the most evil villains in his quest to become more evil.

An iteration of this Hades made his live-action debut in the second half of the fifth season of Once Upon a Time, portrayed by Greg Germann.

Another iteration appears in Descendants 3, portrayed by Cheyenne Jackson. Hades is among the villains imprisoned on the Isle of the Lost, despite his godhood. He is revealed to be Makaria and Melino’s father the ex-husband of Persephone who left Makaria  and Melino with their mother when they were just babies. Hades briefly lent his ember to Mal his daughter in order to undo a spell done by a jealous Audrey. He was later brought over from the Isle of the Lost to revive Audrey. By the end of the film, Hades approves of Mal's marriage to Ben as interaction between Auradon and the Isle of the Lost is allowed. In this case, Hades think that the punishment of Bestia is injust and that he has a prejudice about the villains

Pain and Panic
Pain and Panic (voiced by Bobcat Goldthwait and Matt Frewer) are a pair of shapeshifting imps who are Hades's minions. Pain is a fat, crimson-shaded demon, and Panic is skinny and turquoise. Panic is paranoid, twitchy, panicky, and easily spooked, as his name suggests, but he appears to be relatively smart and is very cautious. He appears to be more honest than Pain. Pain, on the other hand, is bossy, hot-tempered, and sly, but also clumsy, impulsive and liable to get into painful situations, and seems to be less intelligent than Panic.

In the movie, Hades sends them to kidnap baby Hercules, make him mortal, and kill him. The imps obey and capture him in the middle of the night, but fail to kill him, and only half-succeed in making him mortal: he keeps his godlike strength, allowing him to dispose of the pair before they have a chance to kill him. Not wanting Hades to know about their failure, they tell him that Hercules is dead. Many years later Hades discovers that Hercules is actually alive. To try and grovel sufficiently they become insects, reminding Hades they could still kill Hercules in the time left. Throughout the rest of the movie, they're seen either cheering Hades's monsters on, grovelling to Hades, or using their powers to contact Megara. When Hades plots against Hercules, Pain and Panic manage to lure and capture Pegasus by assuming the form of a female Pegasus. At the end of the movie, Hades is punched into the river Styx, and the two are left watching him go down into the river, hoping that he won't return.

Pain and Panic also appear in the Hercules TV series as Hades's lackeys. They made many brief appearances in the House of Mouse television series, usually along with Hades (though there was one episode in which they broke up Pinocchio and Jiminy Cricket without Hades's aid). Pain and Panic had a very small role in the video game Kingdom Hearts II, where they are working for Hades and work at the Underdrome, but have no other purpose. Pain and Panic are also playable characters to unlock for a limited time in Disney Magic Kingdoms.

Gods

Greek Gods

Olympian Gods
 Zeus (voiced by Rip Torn in the film, Corey Burton in the TV series, and Genzo Wakayama in Japanese) is the ruler of Mount Olympus and King of the Gods. Husband of Hera and father of most of the Olympian gods. Many eons ago, Zeus imprisoned the Titans, who threatened to destroy the world, deep beneath the ocean. Unbeknownst to Zeus, the next planetary alignment would reveal the location of the Titans' prison. He was also unaware that his brother Hades was planning to release the Titans, kidnapped his baby son Hercules, who was prophesied to defeat him, and made him mortal. When Hercules grows into a teenager, Zeus tells his son that he must become a "true hero" in order to rejoin the gods, which he later defines as something more than being famous. However, Zeus refuses to clarify what it means, only for Hercules to "look inside his heart" as he needs his son to figure it out on his own. Zeus is betrayed by Hades, but Hercules later saves him and Olympus. Hercules becomes a god after willingly giving his life to save Meg, which Zeus reveals that his son is finally a true hero and can be a god. Nonetheless, Zeus is supportive of his son's decision to remain with Meg.
 Hera (voiced by Samantha Eggar) is the goddess of women and marriage and the queen of the gods. Wife of Zeus and mother of most of the Olympian gods.  
 Hermes (voiced by Paul Shaffer) is the Messenger of the Gods, who is frequently sent by Zeus to contact his son Hercules.
 Apollo (voiced by Keith David) is the God of Light and Music and twin brother of Artemis who drives the Solar chariot.
 Amphitrite (voiced by Leslie Mann) is the Goddess of the Sea, wife of Poseidon, and mother of Otus and Triton.
 Aphrodite (voiced by Lisa Kudrow) is the Goddess of Love with a theme song that even she thinks is annoying. She is quite strong minded, feisty and clever. She has pink skin and blonde hair. She is the wife of Hephaestus, but it is indicated that she is attracted to Phil, whom she is seen making out with at the end of the movie. Hades is constantly trying to flirt with her, to no avail. In Hercules and the Dream Date, she brings Hercules' clay sculpture to life after he asks her for a favour.
 Ares (voiced by Jay Thomas) is the God of War, who just wants to destroy Athens and prove the superiority of Sparta. He hates using 'egghead' and similar words, and is a brash god. Ares also has two "dogs of war" who draw his chariot named Brutacles & Sadisto.
 Fear and Terror (voiced by David Cross and Toby Huss) is the dimwitted yet super strong sons of Ares.
 Artemis (voiced by Reba McEntire) is the Goddess of the Hunt and Wild Animals, and twin sister of Apollo. She is seen protecting the Calydonian Boar and transforms a few of the characters into animals, a reference of her turning a hunter who saw her bathing into a stag in mythology. She is also seen scolding Orion also making references to the Belt of Orion in terms of the star patterns. A few times, she is comically seen fighting off her adoring animal fans like a snake that wraps around her.
 Athena (voiced by Jane Leeves) is the Goddess of Wisdom and witty sister of Ares. Ares tries frequently to destroy her worship city Athens, but Athena always receives help from Hercules. Athena has a pet owl named Ibid that she once lent to Hercules to help him pass his exam given to him by Herodotus.
 Aurora is the Goddess of the Dawn and sister of Helios. She is mentioned in the episode "Hercules and the Jilt Trip". Equivalent to Eos.
 Boreas (voiced by Alan Rosenberg) is the God of the North Wind. He seems to have a grudge against Ares for beating him up when Sparta was being created. Aeolus or any of the other winds do not appear so in the show he may be the God of all of the Winds and husband of Iris.
 Bacchus (voiced by Dom DeLuise) is the God of Wine and Partying. He nearly sinks Phil's island with his revelry that bothered Poseidon.
 Cupid (voiced by Tom Arnold) is the God of Passion also appears. He is shown as an overweight, middle-aged man wearing a diaper. He is son of Ares and Aphrodite, brother of Phobos and Deimos, and husband of Psyche. Cupid has minions called Cherubs, and his quiver holds both "love" and "loathe" arrows. In the film, he is depicted as a skinny teenager and is seen congratulating Hercules.
 Demeter (voiced by Florence Henderson) is the Goddess of Agriculture. Nemesis to smite the satyr Pan for his inadequate offerings at her harvest festival and building a temple to himself. She is also seen among the gods congratulating Hercules.
 Hecate (voiced by Peri Gilpin) is the goddess of witchcraft, who longs to take over the Underworld from Hades. Despite his seeming dislike of the place most of the time, he's very possessive of his kingdom whenever she tries to overthrow him.
 Circe (voiced by Idina Menzel) is a sorceress who while looking for suitable boyfriends, turned most of the male cast into various animals (amongs them being peafowl, ostrich, platypus, ringtailed lemur, raccoon and spotted hyena).
 Hephaestus (voiced by Kevin Michael Richardson) is the God of Fire and the Gods' Blacksmith who has a peg leg for a right leg. He is husband of Aphrodite and hates it when Hades flirts with her. In the film, Hephaestus forges Zeus' thunderbolts when the Titans attack Mount Olympus.
 Hestia (voiced by Betty White) – Only making a few appearances, Hestia is the Goddess of Family and the Hearth is seen as a cheery housewife type. She is often seen cooking or marveling at her own confections... most of which end up being ruined in a comical fashion like when Adonis caused Hercules to crash into her cake.
 Iris is the Goddess of the Rainbow and wife of Boreas. She is mentioned in the episode "Hercules and the Kids".
 Morpheus (voiced by Jonathan Katz) is the God of Sleep. He has a little brother called Phantasos who wanted to become god of sleep but Zeus said that he couldn't because of "seniority." He is also among the gods congratulating Hercules at the end of the film.
 Narcissus is the God of Pride and brother of Trivia. Not truly a god in Greco-Roman mythology, but was depicted several times in both the film and the series as an Olympian god. Hermes notes that he has not "seen this much love in a room since Narcissus discovered himself."
 Trivia (voiced by Ben Stein) is the God of Trivia and brother of Narcissus. In "Hercules and the Pool Party," Trivia was the only god not invited to Hades' pool party at Lethe due to Hades not considering him important enough to invite. Trivia is usually female in actual mythology.
 Nemesis (voiced by Linda Hamilton) is the Goddess of Vengeance who works for the Infernal Retribution Service (IRS), a service which punishes mortals who dislikes and/or disrespects some god or even all the gods – situations that include defacing temples, defalcating offerings, or posing as a god. Nemesis can turn her hands into weapons, and usually gets really angry whenever she can't do a smiting.
 Pan (voiced by Joe Pantoliano) is the God of Shepherds and flocks, of mountain wilds, hunting and rustic music. Son of Hermes. Was shown as merely the king of the satyrs who wants to be worshiped as a god by his people. Pan gains the wrath of Demeter, who threatens to send Nemesis for to smite him for building a temple to himself if he does not give her suitable offerings by the end of the harvest festival. After an attempt to get Phil to take his place which nearly gets the trainer killed, Pan is forced to give up all the offerings of the festival to spare his life. He also appear in the episode "Hercules and the Prince of Thrace" in the story of the Muses with King Midas.
 Persephone is the Goddess of Springtime and daughter of Demeter. She is one of the gods seen congratulating Hercules at the end of the film.
 Phantasos (voiced by Tom Kenny) – At the start of the world, Phantasos wanted to be the God of Sleep only for his brother Morpheus to get the job. Since then, Phantasos plotted to get the job one way or another until the day he created a nightmare counterpart of Morpheus' Blanket of Slumber called the Discomforter. Due to the nightmares people are having, Phantasos suggested to Zeus to become the new God of Sleep should Morpheus fail to stop the nightmare crisis. When in their dreams, Hercules and Phil ended up fighting Phantasos when he turned into the Hydra and Typhon. Though Hercules managed to overcome his nightmare of losing to the Hydra and defeat Phantasos. The next day, Zeus was convinced by Morpheus to make Phantasos the God of Dreams and Nightmares since he is much better at dreams and nightmares than his brother. To improve his work, Phantasos wrote down Zeus's suggestions like no one dreaming is to hit the ground when falling and no one gets caught by dream monsters.
 Poseidon (voiced by Jason Alexander) is the God of the Sea, brother of Zeus and Hades, husband of Amphitrite, and father of Otus and Triton. Amphitrite's nickname for him is "Po-po". He made many cameos in the film, such as when the gods congratulate Hercules. He made a few appearances in the series and many cameos in the Olympian council. In the "Hercules and the Bacchanal," he sunk Phil's Island because of the party of Hercules and after revive it again. In "Hercules and the River Styx," he dealt with Hades to give him a bigger superiority to avenge Athena for taking Athena under her safety, but later he trapped and imprisoned with Athena by Hades. Poseidon and Athena were freed as Poseidon beats up Hades. In "Hercules and the Son of Poseidon," Poseidon persuades Hercules to let Triton attend Prometheus Academy after saving the boat Hercules was on. In this appearance, Hercules referred to Poseidon as his uncle. In "Hercules and the Poseidon's Cup Adventure," Poseidon creates a boat race in his honor.
 Eileithyia  – The Goddess of Childbirth and daughter of Zeus and Hera. She made many cameos in Hercules's birth party.
 Hebe  is the Goddess of Youth and daughter of Zeus and Hera. She made many cameos in Hercules's birth party.
 Psyche – Wife of Cupid. She made many cameos in Hercules's birth party.
 Charon is the rower of the ferry in the Underworld.
 Helios is the God of the Sun and brother of Aurora. He never physically appeared in the series, but the Colossus of Rhodes – which resembles him – appeared in "Hercules and the Hero of Athens". He made many cameos in Hercules's birth party.
 Nike – The Goddess of Victory and daughter of Styx. She is mentioned in the episode "Hercules and the Poseidon's Cup Adventure". She made many cameos in Hercules's birth party.
 Styx is the Goddess of Styx and mother of Nike. Was seen in the episode "Hercules and the River Styx".
 Otus (voiced by Brad Garrett) is the son of Poseidon and Amphitrite and brother of Triton.
 Triton (voiced by Chris Elliott) is the son of Poseidon and Amphitrite and brother of Otus. He yearns to be a hero like his cousin Hercules. Triton has green skin and flippers. He appears in "Hercules and the Son of Poseidon" where Poseidon talks Hercules into letting Triton attend Prometheus Academy.

Titans
The Titans were the giant rulers of the world when it was first created, rampaging until they were imprisoned by Zeus. Four of the five Titans each represent one of the four elements. When the planets were in alignment, Hades freed the Titans and directed them to Mount Olympus. They were defeated by Zeus and Hercules as Hercules sent the Titans flying into outer space where they exploded.

 Lythos (voiced by Corey Burton and Patrick Pinney) is a two-headed Titan made of rock, who created the earth. He also appears in Kingdom Hearts and Kingdom Hearts III as a boss. Unlike the film, Zeus doesn't behead Lythos in the latter video game.
 Hydros (voiced by Jim Ward) is a skeletal Titan made of ice, who created water. Hydros also appears in as a boss in Kingdom Hearts and Kingdom Hearts Birth by Sleep in the Olympus Colisseum, and in Kingdom Hearts III fighting Hercules and Sora with Pyros and Stratos.
 Pyros (voiced by Jim Cummings) is a blob-like Titan made of lava who created fire. Pyros appears as a boss in Kingdom Hearts III fighting Hercules and Sora with Hydros and Stratos.
 Stratos (voiced by Corey Burton) is a Titan who resembles a living tornado, and created air. Hercules used Stratos to suck up the Titans and send them into outer space. Stratos appeared as a boss in Kingdom Hearts III fighting Hercules and Sora alongside Hydros and Pyros. Stratos is then fought after Hydros and Pyros are defeated.
 Agres (voiced by Patrick Pinney) is a gigantic pink-skinned cyclops who Hades instructed to find and kill Hercules while the other four Titans attacked Mount Olympus. He searches through the town causing much property damage until Hercules reveals himself. Hercules had earlier made a deal with Hades that he would have his strength taken away for 24 hours, so Agres takes his time beating him up badly. Phil comes to the rescue and convinces him that he doesn't need his strength to beat him. Shortly afterward, Agres decides to finish him off by biting his head off. Thinking quickly, Hercules shoves a torch into his eye, blinding him and causing him to stumble around. He then uses this opportunity to tie Agres' legs together, causing him to trip and fall off a cliff to his death.

The animated series added some of the named Titans from mythology:

 Antaeus (voiced by Miguel Ferrer) is a half-Titan who founded the P.O.O.T.L.s ("People's Organization of Titanic Liberators") so he could free the Titans. He held Prometheus Academy hostage and wanted Hercules as their prisoner so that he can force Zeus to release them. His giant form resembles a rock version of himself.
 Atlas (voiced by Thomas Lennon) is a muscular Titan that was cursed to forever hold up the sky at the edge of the world. He appeared in "Hercules and the Prince of Thrace".
 Gaia (voiced by Kerri Kenney) is the goddess of the Earth. She sleeps deep beneath the Earth and dislikes anyone who disturbs her, such as Adonis after he awoke her from her eternal slumber after not heeding a warning sign.
 Prometheus (voiced by Carl Reiner) is a kind Titan who stole fire from Olympus and gave it to humanity so they could improve their lives. As punishment, Zeus had Prometheus chained to a rock, where every day the Caucasian Eagle plucked out and ate his liver, which regrew again every night. In the episode "Hercules and the Prometheus Affair", Hercules releases him and convinces Zeus that he did the right thing.

Other Greek myths
 The Fates are three deities who see the future and decide how long mortals live. They share a single eye among them (a trait from another mythological trio, the Graeae).
 Clotho (voiced by Amanda Plummer in the film, Tress MacNeille in the TV series) is the Fate who spins the Thread of Life. She has green skin, wavy yellow worm-like hair and a long pointed chin. In the film, she is flattered by Hades.
 Lachesis (voiced by Carole Shelley) is the Fate who measures the thread's length and decides how long mortals will live. She has blue skin and a long pointed nose.
 Atropos (voiced by Paddi Edwards) is the Fate who cuts the thread. She is short, has purple skin, green serpent-like hair, and is the only fate to have a one eye socket. In "Hercules and the Tapestry of Fate", she has a crush on Hercules and flirts with the "strapping, smooth-skinned" son of Zeus, much to Hercules' embarrassment and disgust.
 The Muses are the five goddesses who provide inspiration for the fine arts, who act as a girl group to narrate the story as a Greek chorus.
 Calliope (voiced by Lillias White) is the Muse of Epic Poetry, with a headband over her big, curly hair. She is the tallest Muse, and serves as the de facto leader of the group.
 Clio (voiced by Vaneese Y. Thomas) is the Muse of History, with a ponytail.
 Melpomene (voiced by Cheryl Freeman) is the long-haired, melodramatic Muse of Tragedy.
 Terpsichore (voiced by LaChanze) is the Muse of Dance, with short hair.
 Thalia (voiced by Roz Ryan) is the short and plump, wisecracking Muse of Comedy.

Norse Gods
In the episode "Hercules and the Twilight of the Gods", Hercules and Phil visit Valhalla and meet the Norse gods, including:

 Loki (voiced by Vince Vaughn) – Cunning, manipulative god of mischief, who planned to have Hercules replace Thor as the god of thunder, allowing him to more easily bring about Ragnarok.
 Odin (voiced by Garrison Keillor) – One-eyed king of Valhalla. He is rather deadpan and often exasperated by the antics of Loki and Thor.
 Thor (voiced by David James Elliott) – Loud and aggressive god of thunder, who wields the hammer Mjolnir. He briefly loses his position to Hercules after being defeated by him in a duel; the challenge was actually fixed by Loki, who wanted Thor out of the way because he is predicted to avert Ragnarok.

Egyptian Gods
In "Hercules and the Romans", the gods of the Egyptian mythology earn temporary worship from the Roman Empire before the Greek pantheon assumes this role and after being driven away by Hercules and Icarus.

 Ra (voiced by Stan Freberg) – God with the head of a falcon.
 Bastet – Goddess with the head of a cat.
 Khnum – God with the head of a ram.

Prometheus Academy
The Prometheus Academy is the fictional high school from the Disney animated television series Hercules. Though set in Ancient Greece (specifically Athens), the Academy shares many traits with modern educational institutions. It is coeducational, with both male and female students, and teaches such diverse subjects as history, astronomy, shop class, theater arts and "Home Greconomics".

Prometheus Academy is the school that the teenaged Hercules attends while training with #Philoctetes to become a hero in the Disney movie Hercules. Many of the other students at the Academy are based on characters from mythology.

The Academy was named after the Titan Prometheus, who brought fire from Mount Olympus (the metaphorical "light of reason") to mankind, and was punished by Zeus being chained to a rock and having his liver pecked out by an eagle every day forever. A bronze statue of Prometheus being administered in his punishment is the central point of the Academy's courtyard.

Prometheus Academy students
 Icarus (voiced by French Stewart) is Hercules' best friend. The boy who escaped from the Labyrinth with his father on wax wings appears as a complete nut (he was "brain-fried" by flying too close to the Sun). Despite his accident, Icarus still flies every chance he gets resulting in a few more encounters with the sun. Icarus is very adaptive and hence could adjust to about every situation, except when he is very jealous and acts irrational. He could become an ultra serious soldier at boot camp or a nearly identical version of Hades himself. Thankfully, at the end of each episode, he reverts to his own odd self. His father Daedalus is a teacher in the academy and Icarus doesn't acknowledge his parents' divorce. Icarus flirts with Cassandra at every opportunity he gets despite Cassandra showing she does not reciprocate. When Icarus graduates, he goes into inventing with his father and makes a fortune, earning the commercial title "The Wax-Wing King". Phil says that in adulthood, Icarus helps his father with inventions.
 Cassandra (voiced by Sandra Bernhard) is the other best friend of Hercules, an attractive yet anti-social girl. Daughter of Vic (Fred Willard) and Evelyn (Georgia Engel), who call her "Casserole". Cassandra is cursed with the helpless ability to foresee catastrophic events, but never to be believed. When one of these prophetic trances overcome her, she becomes immobile and her eyes spin. Icarus calls this her "Cassandra-Vision." Cassandra is constantly annoyed by Icarus's flirtatious behavior towards her and calls him her stalker. She tolerates his presence because before Hercules joined the trio, otherwise she would have no friends. But even after she gained Hercules as a friend, she still continues to socialize with Icarus and even admitted to him that she considers him a good friend. In adulthood, Cassandra's visions have made her famous, even getting her own public show.
 Adonis (voiced by Diedrich Bader) is the idiotic, cowardly, narcissistic, self-obsessed prince of Thrace who bullies Hercules and Icarus every chance he has, but sometimes can be their friend. He also annoys the gods which resulted in Gaia even putting a curse on him once. Adonis believes that anything can be solved with power and money. In "Hercules and the Yearbook" at graduation, he was one credit short and had to attend summer school. He may have been the person whom Meg sold her soul to Hades to save his life, and ditched her for another woman, leaving her to do service for Hades.
 Anaxarete (voiced by Cree Summer) is Herc's girlfriend during "Hercules and the Jilt Trip", who later breaks up with him for no reason.
 Andromeda (voiced by Kath Soucie) is a new student who attracts Herc's attention.
 Ajax (grunts by Frank Welker) is a barbarian student with very bad hygiene.
 Electra (voiced by Joey Lauren Adams) is a Goth student with a habit of defying the established order and a believer in freedom of creativity. Electra is all in all a good person, but vicious Furies are created whenever she feels angry.
 Helen of Troy (voiced by Jodi Benson) is caring and enthusiastic. She was the most popular girl in the academy and Adonis' girlfriend. Helen tries her best to keep Adonis from being a jerk, but mostly fails. She likes Hercules but as a friend. Helen is a princess as in the mythm but is not a half-sister of Hercules in the series.
 Melampus (voiced by Ethan Embry) is a rival of Icarus, due to Cassandra's affections. Mykloid fan-boy of the comic-scroll superhero Myklos.
 Pandora (voiced by Jenna von Oÿ) is a student who possesses a locker full of mysteries.
 Tempest (voiced by Jennifer Jason Leigh) is the quick-tempered Amazon "Warrior Princess". She is the daughter of Queen Hippolyta & King Darius.

Prometheus Academy staff
The following are the faculty members of Prometheus Academy:

 Mr. Parentheses (voiced by Eric Idle) is Prometheus Academy's principal.
 Cassiopeia (voiced by Alice Ghostley) is the poetry professor.
 Phys Oedipus (voiced by Richard Simmons) is the Physical Education professor.
 Miss Thespius (voiced by Kathy Najimy) is the drama professor. Has very long, ankle-length, brown hair in a ponytail.
 Mr. Daedalus (voiced by David Hyde Pierce) is the ProAc Shop Class Instructor, father of Icarus (who calls him Dad-alus), and greatest inventor of all antiquity.
 Mr. Herodotus (voiced by Paul Reubens in the first appearance, Jess Harnell in the second appearance) is the strict History professor.
 Mr. Pygmalion (voiced by Calvert DeForest) is the Art professor who married to a statue of a woman that Aphrodite brought to life.
 Mr. Ptolemy (voiced by George Takei) is an Astronomy Instructor.
 Mr. Aesop (voiced by Bob Keeshan) is the Storytime Instructor for ProAc, Jr (Prometheus Junior Academy).
 Mrs. Euphrosyne (voiced by Melissa Manchester) is the Home Greconomics Professor.
 Mr. Linus (voiced by Jason Marsden) is the Music professor.
 Mr. Euclid (unvoiced) is the Geometry professor.

Jr. Prometheus Academy students
The junior school attached to Prometheus Academy. The students that attend are also figures from mythology or ancient history, though preteen versions of those characters, before they became famous. One of their teachers is Mr. Aesop, who tells stories (his eponymous fables) in order to teach the students by means of his morals.

 Alcides (voiced by Christine Cavanaugh)
 Alex (voiced by Courtland Mead) is a kid whose sandals are always untied because he has trouble with knots. Just like his historical counterpart, Alex would become Alexander the Great and solve the Gordian Knot by slicing it.
 Brutus (voiced by Pamela Adlon) is a centaur foal.
 Callista (voiced by Lacey Chabert)
 Phillip (voiced by Ryan O'Donohue) is a kid with teething troubles.

Heroes
 Achilles (voiced by Dom Irrera) is an old hero who everyone except for Hercules has forgotten. He was once trained by Phil, but he failed due to his heel. The part where he was killed by an attack on his heel was left out of the Disney version.
 Agamemnon (voiced by Patrick Warburton) – In this show, Agamemnon is a famous hero who is the drill sergeant for the Spar O.T.C.
 Alectryon (voiced by Steve Hytner) is a guard and former student of Philoctetes who was turned into a rooster for falling asleep on guard duty. Whenever he crows, anyone who is asleep and hears it wakes up.
 Bellerophon (voiced by David Schramm) is the hero king of Corinth who takes Pegasus in and names him "Ignatius". With the help of Pegasus, Bellerophon is able to defeat the Chimera.
 Cletus (voiced by Charles Kimbrough) is Bellerophon's servant.
 Butes (voiced by Steven Wright) is the Beekeeper from the Argo.
 Chiron (voiced by Kevin Michael Richardson in the first appearance, Louis Gossett Jr. in the second appearance) is a Centaur and hero, famous hero-trainer and author. Chiron is both rival and friend to Phil, and hunting buddy of Nestor and Meleager.
 Hippocrates (voiced by Mandy Patinkin) is the World's First Doctor. He cures people of plague and even goes so far as bringing the dead back to life much to the dismay of Hades.
 Hylas (voiced by Rocky Carroll) is "the bad boy of rowing." Although in Greek mythology, he is the son of Hercules or was at least raised by him. In "Hercules and the Poseidon Cup Adventure," Hylas was on Adonis' team until he got injured and Hercules ended up taking over.
 Jason (voiced by William Shatner) is the leader of the Argonauts.
 Lynceus (voiced by Larry Miller) is the helmsman of the Argo.
 Melampus (voiced by Ethan Embry) is a Prometheus Academy's nerd. He is dating Cassandra, which makes him Icarus' rival. Icarus once tried to hurt him, but was stopped by Hercules.
 Meleager (voiced by Nicholas Turturro) is usually with Nestor. He has extraordinary hearing abilities.
 Mentor (voiced by Edward Asner) is the tough retired police chief who is Chipacles' friend.
 Nestor (voiced by Jim Belushi) is usually with Meleager. He can see very far.
 Odysseus (voiced by Steven Weber) is a cunning king of the Greek island of Ithaca.
 Telemachus (voiced by Justin Shenkarow) is the prince of Ithaca. He, Hercules and three Argonauts end up in their own Odyssey after someone opened the bag of winds given to him by King Aeolus.
 Orpheus (voiced by Rob Paulsen) is a singer and teen idol.
 Paris (voiced by Cary Elwes) is a Trojan Academy student and arrogant Trojan prince.
 Pheidippides was mentioned as a student of Chiron who ran 10000 metres and set a new world record.
 Samson is described as another student of Chiron's who is very strong and is an "out of towner" referring to him being of Israel.
 Theseus (voiced by Eric Stoltz) is Hercules' cousin who briefly enrolls at Prometheus Academy. After the Minotaur escapes from the Labyrinth, he helps Hercules face it. Theseus has a double identity, his second self being the superhero "Grim Avenger", whose costume resembles that of DC Comics' character Doctor Fate, though his personality and backstory are more inspired by Batman. As the Grim Avenger, Theseus is constantly narrating his every move aloud.

Supporting
 Bob (voiced by Charlton Heston in the film and Robert Stack in the TV series) is an incorporeal voice who opens most episodes, but is sometimes then helped by the Muses who act as a "Greek chorus" typically singing their narration. Bob has a wife named "Mrs. Bob" and two children named "Tiffany" and "Chad". Their only appearance on screen is in episode "Return of Typhon" when 'Bob' is convinced by the Muses to take a holiday, their movements are only noticeable thanks to the hats they are wearing, which appear to be floating.
 Demetrius (voiced by Wayne Knight) is a pottery salesman who owns a pottery shop. He only barely tolerates Hercules due to the fear of him breaking his pottery, but the loss of his shop angers him to the point that he openly insults Hercules calling him a freak and ordering Amphitryon to keep him away from the marketplace. The other people that were present supported Demetrius.
 Amphitryon (voiced by Hal Holbrook) is a mortal farmer and Hercules' father. He is protective of his adoptive son and always comforts him. 
 Alcmene (voiced by Barbara Barrie) is Amphitryon's wife and Hercules' mother. She is friendly and loving. 
 Chipacles (voiced by Mike Connors) is the head city-state police officer for the Athens Police Department who takes his job very seriously (Probably a reference to the television show CHiPs).
 Croesus (voiced by Wayne Newton) is the richest man in the world and owner of Atlantis City whose vast wealth causes the Gods and the Fates to give in to his bribes. He once had Cassandra captured by Pain and Panic after bribing Hades so that the vision of Atlantis City sinking wouldn't happen. He even bribed the Fates to declare the vision false. After Homer was also captured, Hercules went to rescue Cassandra and Homer causing Croesus to bribe Poseidon to send Scylla to attack Hercules. Their fight accidentally caused the Fates to cut the Atlantis City banner causing Cassandra's vision to come true and the Fates to flee back to Fate Mountain. Hades shows up to pick up Pain and Panic as Hades notes to Croesus that his wealth is going under water and that Croesus will be in the Underworld in 10 minutes. Upon realizing that Croesus is bad swimmer, Hades quoted "Make that 5."
 Galatea (voiced by Jennifer Aniston) also made an appearance, but not as the wife of Pygmalion the art teacher (whose wife is referred to as simply "Mrs. Pygmalion"), but as the statue Hercules beseeched Aphrodite to bring to life for him as a date to the Aphrodasia Dance. Hercules learned a decidedly different lesson than the one from the original myth. Because he asked that her personality would be "crazy about [him]", Galatea becomes increasingly obsessive about him, especially when he dumped her and dropped her off on an island in the middle of nowhere. Literally, she walked through water to get to him. Being made of clay, she displays morphing abilities that she uses to endanger anyone that might get between her and Hercules. She was solidified by an accidental fire but tried hopping to him. Aphrodite changes her personality to free will, granting her a mind of her own.
 Princess Lavina (voiced by Cheri Oteri) was Geryon's girlfriend for four days before breaking up with him for unknown reasons. She quickly became infatuated with Hercules upon meeting him and, due to Phil's attempts at helping Hercules get over his own break up, believed he felt the same. After telling her that wasn't the case, she was heartbroken until he convinced her to give Geryon another chance. She and Geryon have gotten back together.
 King Tivius (voiced by Val Bettin) is the father of Lavina.
 Gregarious (voiced by Stuart Pankin) is the proprietor of Gyro World. Hercules once interned here as a project from Prometheus Academy.
 Homer (voiced by Dan Castellaneta) is Journalist for a National News-scroll, the "Greekly World News". He tends to exaggerate the facts in his writing for dramatic effect, as seen when he rewrites the rivalry between the Prometheus and Trojan Academies into the story of the Trojan War as well as getting the story on the Sinking of Atlantis City. Coincidentally, his voice actor also voiced another "Homer" from The Simpsons.
 King Midas (voiced by Eugene Levy) is a greedy king whose touch turns everything into gold (after receiving this gift from Bacchus), which wanted Hermes' sandals to transform the whole world. After being foiled in a James Bond manner by Hercules, Midas sees the negative side of his power after accidentally touching his daughter Marigold. To remedy this, King Midas prayed to Bacchus to remove the gift. Bacchus does so and Marigold is returned to normal. In "Hercules and the Prince of Thrace," the Muses sing about how Midas was given donkey ears by Apollo.
 Marigold (voiced by Tia Carrere) is the daughter of Midas.
 Agent Epsilon (voiced by Craig Ferguson) is an agent of Midas who was pretending to be with Athens Intelligence to get Hercules into a trap.
 King Cinyras (voiced by John O'Hurley) is the father of Adonis and husband of Queen Myrrha.
 Queen Myrrha (voiced by Holland Taylor) – In this show, Myrrha is the wife of King Cinyras and the mother of Adonis.
 King Minos (voiced by Charles Nelson Reilly) is an insane King of Crete who had Daedalus construct a labyrinth to hold the Minotaur.
 King Salmoneus (Jeffrey Tambor) is the King of Thessaly. To keep his morality high to the people, he ends up impersonating Zeus and gets struck by a lightning bolt by Zeus after being exposed. After escaping from the Grove of Despair, he conspired with Pain and Panic to reclaim his throne.
 Nereus (voiced by Jim Cummings) is an elderly, grouchy shape-shifter able to turn into various creatures to make people leave him alone. In "Hercules and the Prince of Thrace," Nereus turns into a giant gorilla, serpent, and spider while battling Hercules, nearly defeating the hero-in-training until Adonis helps defeat him, thereby leaving him to help them.
 Numericles and Calculus (voiced by Stephen Tobolowsky and Kevin West) – Numericles is the Abacus creator and a great figure for Abacus Valley and Calculus his aid. In "Hercules and the Techno Greeks", they wanted a hero to help them defeat the local centaurs.
 Orion (voiced by Craig Ferguson) is a great hunter and Artemis' ex-boyfriend and the inventor of the "Orion Cluster." Due to him almost killing off every animal on Earth, he was made a constellation by Artemis to keep Zeus from smiting him. Hercules once freed him to teach him how to use the bow, inadvertently releasing the constellations of Leo, Taurus, Aries, Scorpius, and the Big Dipper.
 Pericles (voiced by Earl Hindman) is a statesman of Athens.
 Queen Hippolyta (voiced by Jane Curtin) is the mother of Tempest and Queen of the Amazons.
 King Darius (voiced by Emeril Lagasse) is the father of tempest, the King of the Amazons and a renowned chef.
 Tiresias (voiced by Jack Carter) is a blind prophet who resides at the Elysian Sunset Rest Home.

One episode featured a crossover with Aladdin, in which Hades and Jafar (voiced by Jonathan Freeman) team up to destroy both their respective archnemesis (ignoring that these two series seem to take place a thousand years apart from each other).

Creatures
 Arachne (voiced by Vicki Lewis) is the guardian of the Tapestry of Fate; a spider-like monster with a bored, sarcastic personality. She only became a guardian because of her mother saying she should see the world and eat exotic people. Arachne attempts to eat Hercules and Icarus, but is unsuccessful. When Hades changed the Tapestry, Arachne was reduced to minding the cave where the Tapestry used to be. Appears in "Hercules and the Tapestry of Fate."
 Argus Panoptes (voiced by Harvey Fierstein) is a multi-eyed monster who has a history with Hermes. Appears in "Hercules and the Bacchanal."
 Nessus (voiced by Jim Cummings) is a large centaur who is also known as the "River Guardian". He is a minor villain and the first monster Hercules fought in the film Hercules in his journey to become a true hero. Megara was sent by Hades to recruit Nessus for his army but Nessus wanted Megara to be his lover in exchange. She refused however, but this only made Nessus more persistent (which is reminiscent of the original myth). Hercules barrels in and, despite a few mistakes such as losing his sword and brandishing a fish, defeated the centaur in a fight.
 The Caucasian Eagle (voiced by Jerry Stiller) is a giant eagle who was ordered by Zeus to eat the liver of Prometheus every day. Hercules battled the eagle while trying to free Prometheus, though he lost his spear and shield in the process. After Hercules freed the Titan, the Eagle allied with Hades, who briefly turned him into a fiery phoenix to battle Hercules again. Appeared in "Hercules and the Prometheus Affair."
 Catoblepas (vocal effects provided by Frank Welker) is a bull monster that Phil once fought. Appears in "Hercules and the Phil Factor."
 Typhon (voiced by Regis Philbin) is the Father of all Monsters and husband of Echidna. He was imprisoned by Zeus under Mount Etna. In the episode "Hercules and the Return of Typhon" Hercules accidentally releases him while fighting with his wife Echidna. It was also revealed that Hera helped Zeus to fight Typhon as she also helped Hercules and Zeus to repel him and Echidna. Then they got Homer to fix the facts.
 Echidna (voiced by Kathie Lee Gifford) is the Mother of all Monsters and wife of Typhon. Echidna had a recurring role in the series and was typically seen as an obsessive and doting mother to her various children who one-by-one were defeated by Hercules. In "Hercules and the Big Games" Echidna enlisted by Hades to bring her children to where Athens and Sparta are holding the first Olympic games so that her children can feed off the spectators. After Hercules defeated her children, Echidna engaged Hercules and gave him a hard time before being defeated by Athena and Ares. In "Hercules and the Return of Typhon", Echidna seeks revenge on Athens which led to Hercules accidentally releasing Typhon. With help from Hera, Hercules and Zeus repelled Echidna and Typhon as well as their latest child Ladon. Then they got Homer to fix the facts. In "Hercules and the Parents Weekend", Echidna finds that Ladon kidnapped the parents of those that attended Prometheus Academy. During this time, Echidna finds that Ladon was teething. As Echidna chases after Hercules after he freed the parents, Echidna is stopped in her tracks by Zeus' lightning bolts striking two rocky formations to incapacitate her.
 Cerberus (vocal effects provided by Frank Welker) is the three-headed dog that guards the Underworld for Hades. He also appeared in the 1998 TV series as a rambunctious Rottweiler puppy that Hades has a hard time controlling.
 The Hydra is an enormous serpent-like creature that grows multiple heads (first it has one, then three, then dozens) every time one is chopped off. In the film, the Hydra serves as the second, more difficult monster Hercules faces after completing his hero training. Hercules unintentionally releases the Hydra from a cave, which has been set up as a fixed contest by Hades to kill the young hero at the start of his career. Neither Hercules nor Phil knew the Hydra by name, or think they covered this frightening foe in basic training. A crowd of Thebans watch as Hercules bravely faces the Hydra with just his sword and his wits. Despite briefly losing his sword and several clumsy attempts in battle, Hercules scrambles to defeat the Hydra. Wrapping its tongue around his leg, the beast throws the young hero upward into the air, catches him in its mouth as he comes down, and swallows him whole. The Hydra thought Hercules had a pleasant flavor as she let out a loud burp, then licked her slimy lips, satisfied with her meal. After a moment, a bulge formed in the Hydra's neck and Hercules slashes his way out from inside the monster's throat. Standing next to the Hydra's headless steaming carcass, covered in green slime, Hercules thought he did great. But the Hydra grows three more heads in its place. Hercules is forced on the defensive; he keeps slicing even though he knows it's a bad idea. He ends up falling into a swarm of Hydra necks, as terrifying snarling heads gang up to attack him. Finally the Hydra pinned Hercules to a cliff with the sharp talons of its foot. Thinking quickly, Hercules smashed his fist into the mountainside, causing an avalanche that buried the young hero and the multi-headed monster under a mountain of rocks. But the Hydra's talons uncurled and Hercules emerged unharmed and victorious, thus earning the hero fame and adoration from the people of Thebes. In the animated series, the Hydra is referenced several times, in which Hercules knew the creature by name, such as claiming to defeat any monsters like "zillion-headed Hydras" or seeing a cloud shaped like a Hydra defeated by a brave hero. In "Hercules and the Long Nightmare", Hercules has nightmares of fighting the Hydra until he overcame his fear.
 Cyclops - An unidentified blue Cyclops with one horn. He is the son of Echidna as revealed in "Hercules and the Big Games".
 Orthos – (voiced by Brad Garrett and Wayne Knight) is a two-headed Cyclops that Hercules first fought in "Hercules and the First Day of School" to prove he's not a nobody. The head that is near his right arm sports a mohawk while the head that is near his left arm has a ponytail. After Echidna tells them they need to eat royalty or at least hero, Orthos initially try to eat Hercules before the cyclops discards him for being "stale" as well as being a nobody. The two heads later set their sights on Adonis. However, they are defeated by Hercules, humiliating them. In "Hercules and the Epic Adventure", Orthos sought revenge for making them the laughingstock of the entire monster community.
 The Nemean Lion (voiced by Jeremy Piven) is a huge lion with a hide that no weapon can penetrate. Appears in "Hercules and the Hero of Athens.
 Chimera (vocal effects provided by Frank Welker) is a fire-breathing enemy of Bellerophon. In this show, it has the head and front legs of a lion, the horns and back legs of a goat, and a snake-headed tail where its body and tail are colored black. Appears in "Hercules and the Pegasus Incident."
 The Minotaur (voiced by Michael Dorn) is a creature with the head and hindquarters of a cattle and the arms and torso of a man. In this show, the Minotaur is depicted as a child of Echidna. He appeared in two episodes: during the first episode – and following his myth –, he was housed inside a Labyrinth built by Daedalus in Crete for its insane king Minos. In the second episode, he had escaped from Crete and reached Athens facing there both Theseus and Hercules only for to be subdued by them together and placed back by the gods. In the film, Hades sends a different Minotaur to kill Hercules together with Stheno and the Griffin, but all of the three are defeated by Hercules in less than a second. Appears in "Hercules and the Minotaur" and "Hercules and the Grim Avenger."
 Gegeines (voiced by Brad Garrett in the first appearance and Frank Welker in the second appearance) is the multi-armed yeti-like sailor-eating giant that was encountered by Hercules and the Argonauts. Appears in "Hercules and the Argonauts." The episode "Hercules and the Big Games" revealed that Gegeines is one of Echidna's children.
 Ladon (vocal effects provided by Frank Welker) is the youngest of Echidna's monsters, who looks similar to a dragon. He tried to eat Hercules multiple episodes, but each time is unsuccessful. At the time when it captured the parents of those who attended Prometheus Academy during "Hercules and the Parents Weekend", Ladon started teething.
 Briareos (voiced by Reggie Miller) is a Hecatonchires. In this show, Briareos is a giant that can conjure arms from the ground and even water. He is also a fan of the comic book hero Myklos.
 Doubt is a snake that bites people, causing them to drown in fear and doubt. Hades called him in to strike Icarus so that he won't kiss Cassandra (because she sold her soul to him to make sure he doesn't kiss her), but his bite wore off quickly. While fighting Hercules, who is trying to make the kiss happen, Doubt easily defeats Hercules and attempts to eat him until Aphrodite the Goddess of Love intervenes. Aprhodite blows a kiss to Doubt, making the serpent feel love and gives the hero-in-training a kiss before letting him down.
 Geryon (voiced by Will Ferrell) is a monster with three torsos with each head and arms on it. Appears in "Hercules and the Jilt Trip."
 The Furies are a flock of giant birds that live in the Underworld. In "Hercules and the Complex Electra", furies were created every time Electra got angry and disappeared when she's calm. Hercules dispatches some while beating them.
 Sea serpent are a type of creatures that are serpents or dragons.
 Ceto/Cetus is a green sea serpent. During the Zero to Hero segment in the film, Hercules easily defeats the monster and turns it into a fishing trophy. In "Hercules and the Underworld Takeover", it appears as a much larger sea serpent that attacks Hercules while he crosses the River Styx, until the hero-in-training knocks the serpent away.
 Sea Snake - In "Hercules and the Complex Electra", the snake was served as "sauté of sea snake" in the Prometheus Academy cafeteria. The snake attacked Hercules, Icarus, and Cassandra, wrapping the three friends in its coils, shortly before Hercules met Electra.
 Three-Headed Sea Serpent (vocal effects provided by Frank Welker) is a three-headed sea monster Poseidon defeats and imprisons in "Hercules and the Son of Poseidon". After it is accidentally released, Hercules tried to fight it until he realized it had too many heads. He and his cousin Triton fight it after it attacks the Prometheus Academy. Poseidon plans to banish it to the deepest parts of the ocean where the giant squids reside.
 Fenrir is a monstrous wolf that was released by Loki in a plot to incite Ragnarok. Appears in "Hercules and the Twilight of the Gods."
 The Frost Giants are the giants of Norse legend from Jotunheim; composed of ice and snow, similar to the Ice Titan. Agents of Loki and enemies of all that is good. Appear in "Hercules and the Twilight of the Gods."
 Griffin – Griffins are a race of creatures that are part-eagle part-lion. In the film, Hades sends him to kill Hercules together with Stheno and the Minotaur, but all the three were defeated by Hercules in less than a second.
 Griff (voiced by Tim Conway) is an elderly griffin that guarded a diamond that Hephaestus forged. He resides at the Elysian Sunset Rest Home.
 Merv Griffin (voiced by Merv Griffin) is an Athenian griffin with his own talk show.
 Gorgon – The Gorgons are creatures that have snakes for hair and anyone who sees them turns to stone.
 Medusa (voiced by Jennifer Love Hewitt) is the famous gorgon whose gaze turns people to stone, although here she is really just lonely and longs for friends. Appears in "Hercules and the Gorgon."
 Stheno (voiced by Andrea Martin) – sister of Medusa and Euryale. She appeared in "Hercules and the Phil Factor". In the film, Hades sends her to kill Hercules together with the Minotaur and the Griffin, but all of the three are defeated by Hercules in less than a second.
 Euryale is the sister of Medusa and Stheno. In the episode "Hercules and the Phil Factor", she was seen in a picture on Stheno's home fireplace.
 King Arismap (voiced by Harvey Korman) is the King of the Arismapse (a race of thieving mountain gnomes) who had been trying to steal the diamond that Griff guards.
 King Ephialtes (voiced by Jim Varney) is a tree giant who is the King of the Dryads and the father of Syrinx. Appears in "Hercules and the Muse of Dance."
 Syrinx (voiced by Annie Potts) is a nymph who is the daughter of Ephialtes. Appears in "Hercules and the Muse of Dance."
 The Laestrygonian (voiced by Patrick Warburton) is a giant that Hades tries to lure to his side. He is a big fan of Orpheus.
 The Man-Eating Mares (vocal effects provided by Frank Welker) – Phil helps Hercules with the task of taking down one of these dangerous horses, while Hades sends Neurosis to make sure Hercules fails. When the Man-Eating Mares prove to be difficult for Hercules, biting his foot, he calls on his father for help. Zeus (who possesses his statue after Cerberus destroyed his cloud) manages to scare off the Mares. Appear in "Hercules and the Tiff on Olympus."
 Memnon (voiced by David Alan Grier) is a reptilian fire-breathing monster, similar to a half-man and half-dragon, who is a servant of Hades. He fights the hero Achilles, who briefly allied himself with Hades to separate the hero-in-training Hercules and Phil, but was later sent to kill Hercules and Phil until Achilles intervenes. Appears in "Hercules and the Living Legend" and "Hercules and the Phil Factor."
 Charybdis is a sea monster with only a mouth in her head without eyes that make a giant whirlpool who swallows ships whole. She appeared in "Poseidon's Cup Adventure" and in "Hercules and the Odyssey Experience".
 Scylla is a sea monster resembling a woman with an eel's tail and six eel-like heads circling her waist. Hercules fought her twice in "Hercules and the Big Sink" and "Hercules and the Odyssey Experience."
 Sphinx Martindale (voiced by Wink Martindale) is a trivia game show host who asks questions nobody can answer until Hercules comes along winning a chariot in the process. This left Sphinx Martindale depressed.
 Squiggles is a giant squid that appeared in "Hercules and the Bacchanal" as Poseidon's pet. After Phil's island sinks, the squid attacks young Hercules and Hermes, almost eating the two before Poseidon summons him.
 The Winged Wolves of Hecate (voiced by Jon Cryer and Jim Cummings) are two wolves with bird-like wings who work for Hecate.

References 

Characters
Lists of Disney animated film characters
Lists of characters in American television animation
Hercules